The first Galan government, led by president Giancarlo Galan, was the government of Veneto from 26 June 1995 to 6 June 2000.
Source: Veneto Region

Governments of Veneto
1995 establishments in Italy
2000 disestablishments in Italy